Waiting for Armageddon is a 2009 American documentary film that studies Armageddon theology and Christian eschatology.  Some evangelicals  in the United States believe that bible prophecy predicts events including the rapture and the Battle of Armageddon. The documentary raises questions regarding how this theology shapes United States and Middle East relations and how it may encourage an international holy war.

Interviews

The documentary interviews Christians, Zionists, Jews and probes the politics and alliance between Evangelical Christians and Israel.  This alliance is believed by some to set the stage for World War III.

Structure
The documentary is structured around four stages of the apocalypse: 1) Rapture; 2) Tribulation; 3) Armageddon; 4) Millennialism.

See also
Left Behind: The Movie
Tel Megiddo

References

External links

2009 films
American documentary films
Apocalyptic films
Apocalypticism
Christian eschatology
Films about evangelicalism
Christian fundamentalism
Films about religion
Prophecy
2000s English-language films
Films directed by David Heilbroner
Films directed by Kate Davis
2000s American films